"Revolution Is My Name" is a song by American heavy metal band Pantera. It was the first single from the band's final album, Reinventing the Steel. It was also included on the band's compilation album Far Beyond the Great Southern Cowboys' Vulgar Hits!.

Release and reception
"Revolution Is My Name" reached number 28 on the Billboards Mainstream Rock Tracks. The song was nominated for Best Metal Performance in the 2001 Grammys, but lost to Deftones' "Elite". However, it won a 2000 Metal Edge Readers' Choice Award for Song of the Year. The song's music video was voted as the 15th Greatest Metal Video of the 21st Century on Headbangers Ball in 2005.

Music video
The music video for the song was directed by Jim Van Bebber and produced by Grant Cihlar for 1171 Production Group. The video is a mix of various elements: between performances from the band and live footage. It also contains comical snippets of a sitcom-esque interpretation of the band's childhood, where the musicians are portrayed as small kids (with facial hair included) listening to Led Zeppelin and ZZ Top while jumping on the bed and playing oversized instruments. The video also includes flashes of the band's influences such as Black Sabbath and Kiss.

Track listing
Promo single

Extended play (EP)

Charts

References

Pantera songs
2000 singles
Songs written by Phil Anselmo
Songs written by Vinnie Paul
Songs written by Dimebag Darrell
Songs written by Rex Brown
1999 songs
East West Records singles